Baron William de Gelsey of Gelse and Beliscse (17 December 1921, Vienna – 26 February 2021, London), internationally known as William de Gelsey, was a British banker and economist of Hungarian origin. He was chief adviser of the Board of Directors of UniCredit CAIB Securities and chairman of the board of directors at the pharmaceutical company Richter Gedeon Nyrt.

Family background 
De Gelsey was the son of Dr. Henrik de Gelsey (1890–†?), lawyer and landowner, and Marguerite Lieser, a scion of the Gutmann family of Gelse and Beliscse. His mother was Austrian. His father's family lost their Croatian estates after the First World War. His paternal great-grandfather, Henrik Gutmann (1805–1890) of Gelse, was the president of the Nagykanizsa Savings Bank, founder and president of the Nagykanizsa Trade and Industry Bank shareholders' association, a citizen of Nagykanizsa, who was granted nobility and the noble predicate of Gelse from King Franz Joseph I of Hungary on 26 December 1869; his paternal great-grandmother was Nanette Strasser (1819–1878). His paternal grandfather, Baron Vilmos Gutmann of Gelse and Beliscse (1847–1921), a resident of Nagykanizsa, was appointed a royal councillor on 25 February 1882 and was subsequently granted the rank of Baron as well as the predicate of Beliscse on 16 September 1904. In 1895, the generous Vilmos Gutmann of Gelse established the 'Vilmos Gutmann of Gelse Scholarship Foundation', which was intended for untiring students of exemplary conduct at the main grammar school of Nagykanizsa. Baron William de Gelsey's paternal grandmother, was the noble Krausz Rozália of Megyer (1854–1932). His maternal great-grandfather, Krausz Mayer (1809–1894), was a landowner and distiller, who had been granted nobility and the noble predicate of megyeri by the King on 3 September 1882. Baron William de Gelsey's aunt was Baroness Lilly Amália Gutmann of Gelse and Beliscse (1882–1954), whose husband, Baron Iván Skerlecz of Lomnica (1873–1951), was the Ban of Croatia-Slavonia.

Career 
After studying at the Royal Catholic University High School in Budapest, he followed in his father's footsteps to obtain an MA in Natural Sciences from Trinity College, Cambridge. At that time he wanted to be a chemist.

After gaining experience at Imperial Chemical Industries (ICI), he turned to management consulting when it became apparent that as a Hungarian he had little chance of becoming head of the international division. In 1960 he turned to investment banking. First as managing director of Hill Samuel & Co, he later became managing director and then vice-chairman of Orion Royal Bank, a major international consortium (NatWest/Chase/WestLB/Royal Bank of Canada/Credito Italiano/Mitsubishi Tr). Gelsey's nickname at Orion was Wandervogel, 'world traveller'.

He visited Hungary only twice during the communism. In 1974, he represented Orion Royal Bank at the 50th anniversary of the founding of the Hungarian National Bank.

In 1988 he moved to Vienna, where he became an adviser to what is now UniCredit Bank (formerly Creditanstalt).

The Hungarian subsidiary of Creditanstalt acted as the advisor to the privatisation of Gedeon Richter after which, in 1995 Gelsey was elected as a member of the Richter board. Four years later, he became chairman of the board, a position he has held ever since 2011.

Charitable works 
Together with his brother Alexander de Gelsey, they played an instrumental role in returning the more than 300-year-old Royal University Catholic High School (which was closed in 1948) to its original building. It took three years of litigation to get the building back from the capital's municipality. The brothers set up the Catholic University High School Foundation, which contributed more than 100 million forints to the modernisation of the building. William de Gelsey personally secured the application for the 'EEA and Norwegian Financial Mechanisms' tender as well as co-financed 15% of the project (€150,000).

Honours and awards

Arms

References 

1921 births
2021 deaths
Hungarian emigrants
Hungarian businesspeople
Businesspeople from Vienna
Hungarian nobility
Gelsey, William de